Woolford's Water is a village in Dorset, England.

Villages in Dorset